Glenda Joy Hall (born 5 May 1964) is an Australian former cricketer who played as an all-rounder, bowling right-arm leg break and batting right-handed. She appeared in two Test matches and two One Day Internationals for Australia between 1984 and 1988. She played domestic cricket for Australian Capital Territory and Queensland.

In 1985, Hall was a member of an Australian Board President's XI along with players including Marie Cornish, Tina Macpherson, Karen Brown and Trish Dawson that played against a Women's Cricket Association XI selected by Audrey Collins.

On 5 April 2019, Hall was one of the first six inductees into the Cricket ACT Hall of Fame.  The other five were Peter Solway, Michael Bevan, Bronwyn Calver, Lorne Lees and Greg Irvine.

References

External links
 
 
 Glenda Hall at southernstars.org.au

1964 births
Living people
Cricketers from Brisbane
Australia women Test cricketers
Australia women One Day International cricketers
ACT Meteors cricketers
Queensland Fire cricketers